San Japan is an annual three-day anime convention held during August/September at the Henry B. Gonzalez Convention Center, San Antonio Grand Hyatt Hotel, and San Antonio Marriott Riverwalk in San Antonio. The convention is held over Labor Day weekend.

Programming
The convention typically offers an arcade, Artist's Alley, charity auction, concerts, cosplay chess, cosplay dating game, dealers room, electronic dances, a formal masquerade, grand cosplay show, Lolita fashion show, panels, tabletop gaming, video games, and workshops.

The 2014 convention had a blood drive and the charity auction benefited the San Antonio Battered Women and Children's Center. The 2015 convention had a blood drive and some charity funds were donated to San Antonio Pets Alive. San Japan held a blood drive, food drive, and the Charity Auction would benefit disABILITYsa in 2017. The 2018 charity auction benefited disABILITYsa and UTSA East Asia Institute. In 2018, San Japan brought $3.6 million to the local economy.

History
Due to venue issues, the first thee day San Japan in July 2007 couldn't occur as planned. The first San Japan instead was held in various locations on the campus of Our Lady of the Lake University in 2007, benefiting the OLLU Anime Club and the Congregation of Divine Providence. San Japan moved to El Tropicano Riverwalk Hotel (El Tropicano Holiday Inn) and San Antonio Municipal Auditorium in 2008, along with expanding to three days. The convention moved to the San Antonio Marriott Rivercenter in 2010, would leave after 2011, and move to the Henry B. Gonzalez Convention Center. The San Antonio Grand Hyatt Hotel changed its elevator policy prior to the 2015 convention and began to limit access via a wristband system.

San Japan used additional space in the expanded Henry B. Gonzalez Convention Center, having 100,000 square feet for vendors and 40,000 for gaming in 2016. They also clarified convention policy that no firearms are allowed at the event despite the passage of Texas law HB 910 allowing open carry. San Japan in 2017 was held only a few days after Hurricane Harvey affected Texas. The convention in 2019 announced it would be held at the Henry B. Gonzalez Convention Center until at least 2026. In June 2020, the convention's chairman apologized and later resigned due to comments made about people of color. San Japan 2020 was cancelled due to the COVID-19 pandemic.

The 2021 event had a attendance cap of 10,000, with mask and vaccination or heath assessment requirements.

Event history

References

External links

Anime conventions in the United States
Recurring events established in 2007
2007 establishments in Texas
Annual events in Texas
Conventions in Texas
Japanese-American culture in Texas
Culture of San Antonio
Festivals in San Antonio
Tourist attractions in San Antonio